Quercus pentacycla is an uncommon Asian species of tree in the beech family Fagaceae. It has been found only in the Province of Yunnan in southwestern China. It is placed in subgenus Cerris, section Cyclobalanopsis.

Quercus pentacycla is a tree up to 15 meters tall. Twigs are grayish brown. Leaves can be as much as 14 cm long.

References

External links
line drawing, Flora of China Illustrations vol. 4, fig. 388, drawings 1-3 at upper right

pentacycla
Endemic flora of Yunnan
Trees of China
Plants described in 1966